Zumpango de Ocampo is a city and the municipal seat of municipality of Zumpango, State of Mexico and it is also the regional seat of the Zumpango Region, an administrative sub-division. It is currently an important urban center of the state and according to the 2010 census, it had a total population of 50,742 inhabitants.

References

Populated places in the State of Mexico
Municipality seats in the State of Mexico
Zumpango